LRMC can refer to:

 Long-run marginal cost
 Landstuhl Regional Medical Center, a U.S. Army post and hospital in southwest Germany
 Light Rail Manila Corporation, the private operator of Manila Light Rail Transit System Line 1 or LRT-1